The Illinois Skyway Collegiate Conference is an athletic conference associated with the National Junior College Athletic Association (NJCAA). The conference consists of eight community colleges located in the suburbs of Chicago. The conference supports a wide range of intercollegiate athletic sports and student activities events.

Member schools

Current members
The Illinois Skyway (or ISCC) currently has eight full members, all are public schools:

Notes

Former members
The Illinois Skyway (or ISCC) had four full members, all were public schools:

Notes

See also 
National Junior College Athletic Association (NJCAA)
North Central Community College Conference, also in Region 4
Arrowhead Conference, also in Region 4

References

External links
Illinois Skyway Conference website
NJCAA Region 4 website
NJCAA website

NJCAA conferences
College sports in Illinois